Anniken Paulsen  (born 28 April 1955 in Greåker) is a Norwegian contemporary composer and pianist.

Career
Paulsen studied piano with Reimar Riefling and at the Østlandets Musikkonservatorium (today the Norwegian Academy of Music), specializing as a soloist. Her debut as a pianist came in 1980 with a full-night concert featuring works by Franz Liszt, Arnold Schoenberg, Robert Schumann, Anton Webern, and Maurice Ravel. Later, Paulsen studied composition at the Norwegian Academy of Music.

Paulsen worked with lyricist Thomas Howarth Kay to create the musical Destiny!  Key works since the turn of the 21st-century include Circle of Life, which depicts the creation of earth (premiered by the Norwegian Wind Ensemble); 15 første sanger til Destiny, music for the drama documentary Edvard Munchs Mødre (for piano trio); 2014 Overture (DNBE); Four Reasons (for soprano and string quartet); and  Kid, Viking, King & Saint (Olav) (for flute and guitar).

Paulsen has received commissions from the Arts Council Norway, Concerts Norway, NRK, Arctic Brass, the Festival of North Norway and has had her works featured at festivals Føling i Fjæra, Månefestivalen in Fredrikstad, the Festival of North Norway Autunnale, ILIOS-festivalen and Glengfestivalen.

Production

Selected works
 Korinter 13 : For organ, choir and percussion (2016)
 2014 Overture (2014)
 Four Reasons : For string quartet & soprano (2014)
 Circle of Life (2011)
 RissKiss (2007)
 Tidspunktet  (2000)
 Credo eros (1999)
 Arctic Light (1997)
 A Bit of Kilimanjaro : Quartet for Saxophones (1992)

Discography
 Arctic Brass, Burning Ice (2001)

References

External links
List of works supplied by the National Library of Norway

1955 births
21st-century classical composers
Norwegian contemporary classical composers
Women classical composers
Living people
21st-century women composers